The Tiliqua scincoides scincoides, or eastern blue-tongued lizard, is native to Australia. It is unique due to its blue tongue, which can be used to warn off predators. In addition to flashing its blue tongue, the skink hisses and puffs up its chest to assert dominance and appear bigger when in the presence of its predators such as large snakes and birds. The eastern blue tongue  is ovoviviparous and precocial, meaning that its young are more developed and advanced at their time of birth. The Tiliqua scincoides scincoides is not venomous to humans and can be found in suburban and urban areas, specifically in house gardens.

Nomenclature 

The eastern blue-tongued lizard (Tiliqua scincoides scincoides) is a species of skink in the genus Tiliqua. The Tiliqua scincoides scincoides can also be called the common blue tongue, the eastern bluetongue, the eastern blue-tongued lizard, or skink. The Tiliqua scincoides scincoides is in the Animalia kingdom, the Chordata phylum, the Reptilia class, the Squamata order, the Scincidae family, the Tiliqua genus, the T Scincoides species, and the T. s. Scincoides subspecies.

Appearance
The eastern blue-tongued lizard has a short body and short legs. This lizard weighs approximately 1 kilogram and extends approximately 60 centimeters. 360mm of the 60 cm are the lizards' head and body. The snout-vent length is 300-320mm and the hind limb length makes up 20% of snout-vent length. The skinks have tails that are short and robust. In other words, the length of the hind legs are roughly 62 mm while the tail length is approximately 195mm and makes up 50-75% of the snout-vent length.

The lizard can have different colors, but its pattern frequently appears to be banded. The tongue of the lizard is a blue color and can appear to have a hint of violet. This blue tongue is used to alarm predators and scare them off. The eastern blue-tongue lizard has smooth skin covered with scales that overlap and have small bone plates. The ventral (abdominal) region of the lizard is a silver or gray color. The lizard's back, however, appears dark brown and cream-colored and its head is pale brown. Across its body, the eastern-blue-tongued lizard has broad black and brown bands.  This lizard can generally be identified by its black stripe that extends from its eye to its tympanum (exposed eardrum), and sometimes all the way to the side of the lizard's neck. The lizards blue tongues could be an evolutionary adaptation that can assist in long distance communication in order warn off predators and decrease aggressive activity.

Habitat

Tiliqua scincoides scincoides are found in the coastal plain and lower Blue Mountains in Sydney, Australia and in the majority of New South Wales and Cobar. Eastern blue tongues frequent in the open country and take shelter among large objects on the ground like logs or rocks or among leaf litter. Blue tongued lizards are incapable of producing their own body heat, as are all lizards. Because of this, they spend their mornings in the sun before looking for food in order to maintain their body temperature which is between 30-35 degrees Celsius when they are active. In the winter, however, when the weather is cold, lizards bury themselves in their shelter sites and are not active. These lizards only leave their shelters on days where the sun is out, so that they can bask in the sun. They infrequently leave the comfort of their hollow logs and ground debris.

Temperature regulation 

Tiliqua scincoides scincoides are behaviorally regulated by their internal temperature which is a direct result of the peripheral temperature and the temperature of their brains. In a study done in 1969, the behavior of this species was observed between warm and cold environments. The results of this study suggested that when the lizards were inactive, they chose to move to a place that was cooler, therefore causing their internal temperatures to decrease. When their internal temperatures reached a reproducible level when in heat, they decided to return to a more neutral environment. It has also been found that juvenile lizards utilize higher environmental temperatures and thermo-regulate more often than adult lizards.

Conservation status

Eastern blue tongued lizards may eat poisonous snails and slugs that have been tainted by snail baits. If these lizards are living in a garden, they may be exposed to snail baits and insecticides that can cause them harm. Because blue tongued lizards are able to squirm through small holes in fences and under fences, they may be faced with garden pests or chemicals used by neighbors. When these lizards are kept as pets, they often are attracted to horizontal pipes, cavities under houses, and rockeries as hiding sites. The Tiliqua scincoides scincoides shows signs of having a stable population, whereas its sister species, the Tiliqua scincoides intermedia appears to have a population that is declining. In Australia, there has been a ban on exportation and trading of reptiles. Although there is a ban, the blue tongue is a very popular lizard to trade due its unique tongue color.

According to a consensus published in 2017 by the San Diego Zoo Wildlife Alliance Library, the eastern blue-tongued lizard has a wide distribution and it is categorized as “least concern” in terms of endangerment. Regardless of their stable population, these lizards are protected in Australia as a native species. Government regulations like the Environment Protection and Biodiversity Conservation Act in 1999 have positively influenced the preservation of the eastern blue-tongued lizard.

Close relatives

This specific species is closely related to 2 other species, Tiliqua scincoides intermedia and Tiliqua scincoides chimaera.  However, they have different habitats. The Tiliqua scincoides scincoides is native to southern and eastern Australia. On the other hand, the Tiliqua scincoides intermedia is native to northern Australia and the Tiliqua scincoides chimaera is native to the Maluku Province in Indonesia. These lizards are found in mixed woodland habitats, semi-deserts, and scrubland areas in Tasmania, Australia, and New Guinea. They can also be found habituating in terrestrial biomes such as scrub forests, grasslands, or the savanna.

Diet
As an omnivore, the blue tongued skink has a diet that consists of plants, fruits, insects, and other reptiles. Captive studies have been conducted and have shown that high quality dog food is one of the best food sources for these lizards as it has extra minerals and vitamins.  These lizards eat during the day and have been labeled as diurnal. Because eastern blue tongued lizards are agile, they frequently consume animals that move more slowly. Typically, they tend to munch on snail shells and beetles. They are able to do so because their jaw muscles are strong and their teeth are large. These lizards also eat crickets and wax worms.

Reproductive cycle and parental care

The eastern blue tongue becomes sexually mature between 561 and 590 days. The Tiliqua scincoides scincoides is said to be ovoviviparous because the mother lays live young that are more developed than the typical offspring as the young have spent more time developing inside of the mother.The Tiliqua scincoides scincoides is reported to be ovoviviparous, which means eastern blue tongue embryos develop inside eggs that are retained within the mother's body until they are hatched.  Since baby lizards are born in this mode, there is no risk of predators stealing the eggs. On average, each female has about 10 offspring and due to this process, the offspring all have an elevated level of survival. Female lizards give birth to 6-20 young per year. Similar to other animals, these offspring are nourished by the primitive placenta.

Tiliqua scincoides scincoides are precocial species, meaning that they are born at a more advanced developmental stage and therefore do not require as much parental care because their brain is mostly developed at the time of their birth, unlike altricial species. A study done on these lizards found that adults and juveniles are able to distinguish between color and shape stimuli successfully and one was not superior in learning capabilities. This study highlights the idea that Tiliqua scincoides scincoides are behaviorally flexible and adaptable in both adulthood and youth, specifically in reversal learning. These results, however, did not support the formation of an attentional set.

Interestingly enough, research has been done that has shown that sexual maturity occurs at different body sizes depending on the location that a male Tiliqua scincoides scincoides resides. For example, it was found that sexuality maturity happens at smaller body sizes in southern part of Australia than in Queensland.

Lifespan
In captivity, the eastern blue-tongued lizard can live in excess of 20 years.

Predators and parasites

Reptile ticks 
Blue tongued lizards can be attacked by reptile ticks which attach under their scales or inside of their ear canal. These reptile ticks do not cause paralysis and do not latch onto mammals, only onto reptiles. Other than ticks, mites and nematode worms are also parasites to the eastern blue tongue.

Other predators 
Blue tongues fall prey to large snakes and large predatory birds. The large snakes include the mulga snake (Pseudechis australis), the red bellied black snake, the black headed python (Aspidites malanocephalus), and the eastern brown snake The large predatory birds include the laughing kookaburras and brown falcons. Eastern blue tongued lizards can also be eaten by feral dogs and cats. Other predators of the eastern blue tongue include goannas, dingoes, and domestic cats and dogs.

Behavior and physiology 
Tiliqua scincoides scincoides show very little aggression and are said to be docile and shy. The eastern blue tongued lizard has a blue tongue in order to scare off potential predators. When predators approach the lizard, it opens its mouth and sticks out its blue tongue to warn off predators showing that it may be distasteful. The lizards also hiss, which adds fear to any potential predators.

Many methods have been explored in order to best categorize lizards as male or female.  Lizard sex can be determined non invasively by measuring head width, snout-vent length, weight, and trunk length. Specifically, ratios of head width to snout-vent length and head width to trunk length can be calculated to determine the sex of the blue tongued eastern lizard.

Studies have been done that show that reptiles are capable of feeling human like feelings such as anxiety and pleasure among other emotions.

Protective coloration
It has been hypothesized that the Tiliqua scincoides scincoides has a blue tongue in order to mimic the Death Adder which shares some characteristics with the lizard and is poisonous. The Death Adder and the tiliqua scincoides scincoides have very similar coloration. Additionally, since this type of lizard has very short legs, it does look very similar to a snake. The Tiliqua scincoides scincoides hisses loudly and puffs up its chest to appear larger and assert dominance. This lizard species can also lose its tail during a quarrel and regrow it. It typically takes a year for their tail to regrow. In terms of breeding, the Tiliqua scincoides scincoides spend most of their time alone. However, September, October, and November are mating months. These months consist of fights between males in order to attain their first choice female. More research needs to be done on whether the skinks blue tongue is a result of an adaptation that is anti-predatory or if it serves as infraspecific communication. Studies have been done, however, that have supported the idea that the amount of melanin that is present in the skink's skin does not heavily effect tongue coloration  Another interesting finding is that blue colored tongues have similar chromatic qualities to UV blue skin patches and can be reflective. Another finding from this 2015 study is that “UV blue tongues are more conspicuous than pink tongues, especially in the visual model of conspecifics”.

Olfaction
The eastern blue tongue skink has an olfactory epithelium that appears to be of the pseudo stratified type and is loosely packed. The underlying Bowman glands and other supporting cells secrete to the olfactory epithelium's surface which has cilia from sensory cells and microvilli from supporting cells.

Venom
Tiliqua scincoides scincoides are not poisonous or deadly to humans. Bites from this skink will cause pain and leave a bruise, however it will not cause any long term effects.

Interactions with humans and livestock
The eastern blue tongue can adapt to suburban living as well as cities. The skink can be found in gardens or basking in the sun on roads or drain pipes. As the Tiliqua scincoides scincoides can live in urban areas, it can face injury from house pets such as cats and dogs, be hit by cars, or harmed by gardening tools.

References

Sources

External links

BlueTongueSkinks.net
Blue-tongued skinks, Melissa Kaplan's Herp Care Collection
Tiliqua scincoides , James Cook University

Skinks of Australia
Reptiles described in 1790